Anderson County (county code AN) is a county located in East Central Kansas, in the Central United States.  As of the 2020 census, the county population was 7,836. Its county seat and most populous city is Garnett.

History

Early history

For many millennia, the Great Plains of North America was inhabited by nomadic Native Americans.  From the 16th century to 18th century, the Kingdom of France claimed ownership of large parts of North America.  In 1762, after the French and Indian War, France secretly ceded New France to Spain, per the Treaty of Fontainebleau.

19th century
In 1802, Spain returned most of the land to France, but keeping title to about 7,500 square miles.  In 1803, most of the land for modern day Kansas was acquired by the United States from France as part of the 828,000 square mile Louisiana Purchase for 2.83 cents per acre.

In 1854, the Kansas Territory was organized, then in 1861 Kansas became the 34th U.S. state.  In 1855, Anderson County was established, named for territorial legislator Joseph C. Anderson.

In 1884, the first photograph of a tornado was taken in Anderson county.

Geography

Adjacent counties
 Franklin County (north)
 Miami County (northeast)
 Linn County (east)
 Bourbon County (southeast)
 Allen County (south)
 Woodson County (southwest)
 Coffey County (west)

Major highways
Sources:  National Atlas, U.S. Census Bureau
 U.S. Route 59
 U.S. Route 169
 Kansas Highway 31
 Kansas Highway 52
 Kansas Highway 58

Demographics

 

As of the 2000 census, there were 8,110 people, 3,221 households, and 2,264 families residing in the county.  The population density was 14 people per square mile (5/km2).  There were 3,596 housing units at an average density of 6 per square mile (2/km2).  The racial makeup of the county was 97.41% White, 0.32% Black or African American, 0.74% Native American, 0.22% Asian, 0.02% Pacific Islander, 0.33% from other races, and 0.95% from two or more races. Hispanic or Latino of any race were 1.09% of the population. 35.0% were of German, 20.4% American, 10.4% English and 9.9% Irish ancestry.

There were 3,221 households, out of which 31.00% had children under the age of 18 living with them, 59.90% were married couples living together, 6.90% had a female householder with no husband present, and 29.70% were non-families. 26.80% of all households were made up of individuals, and 15.60% had someone living alone who was 65 years of age or older.  The average household size was 2.48 and the average family size was 3.00.

In the county, the population was spread out, with 26.20% under the age of 18, 7.00% from 18 to 24, 24.60% from 25 to 44, 22.10% from 45 to 64, and 20.00% who were 65 years of age or older.  The median age was 40 years. For every 100 females there were 96.70 males.  For every 100 females age 18 and over, there were 93.50 males.

The median income for a household in the county was $33,244, and the median income for a family was $39,101. Males had a median income of $30,102 versus $20,705 for females. The per capita income for the county was $16,458.  About 10.60% of families and 12.80% of the population were below the poverty line, including 16.30% of those under age 18 and 11.00% of those age 65 or over.

Government

Laws
Following amendment to the Kansas Constitution in 1986, the county remained a prohibition, or "dry", county until 1996, when voters approved the sale of alcoholic liquor by the individual drink with a 30 percent food sales requirement.

Education

Unified school districts
 Garnett USD 365
 Crest USD 479

Communities

Cities
 Colony
 Garnett
 Greeley
 Kincaid
 Lone Elm
 Westphalia

Census-designated places
 Harris
 Welda

Other unincorporated communities

 Amiot
 Bush City
 Central City
 Glenlock
 Mont Ida
 Northcott
 Scipio
 Selma

Townships
Anderson County is divided into fourteen townships.  The city of Garnett is considered governmentally independent and is excluded from the census figures for the townships.  In the following table, the population center is the largest city (or cities) included in that township's population total, if it is of a significant size.

Media
Anderson County Review is a weekly newspaper.

See also

 National Register of Historic Places listings in Anderson County, Kansas

References

Further reading

 Plat Book of Anderson County, Kansas; Northwest Publishing Company; 41 pages; 1901.
 The History Of Anderson County, Kansas, From Its First Settlement To The Fourth Of July, 1876; W.A. Johnson; Kauffman & Iler; 289 pages; 1877.

External links

County
 
 Anderson County - Directory of Public Officials
 Anderson County - Development Agency
Historical
 Anderson County - History, Kansas State Historical Society
 Poster from Ninth Annual Anderson County Fair from September 25-28, 1891
Maps
 Anderson County Maps: Current, Historic, KDOT
 Kansas Highway Maps: Current, Historic, KDOT
 Kansas Railroad Maps: Current, 1996, 1915, KDOT and Kansas Historical Society

 
Kansas counties
1855 establishments in Kansas Territory